For a Moment may refer to:

 For a Moment (song), a song by Brooke Hogan
 For a Moment, a song from The Little Mermaid II: Return to the Sea
 For a Moment (album), a 2007 album by Maria Arredondo